Saving Hope is a Canadian television supernatural medical drama that debuted on the CTV and NBC networks simultaneously on June 7, 2012. The show's central character is Dr. Alex Reid (Erica Durance), a doctor whose fiancé, Dr. Charles Harris (Michael Shanks), is in a coma after being in a car accident. The show follows the life of Harris in his coma state, and Reid dealing with patients, and "hoping" that he will survive. Dr. Reid is the Chief Surgical Resident at Hope Zion Hospital in Toronto, and Dr. Harris would normally be the Chief of Surgery at Hope Zion, but had been replaced due to his current condition.

In September 2012, NBC pulled the last two episodes of the first season, and released them online, subsequently canceling the series. And then, in early 2014, Ion Television picked the up the US rights to first three season of the show and it began airing from the start and on October 13, 2015 and aired the last two episodes NBC had skipped before cancelling the show and season three premiered on April 5, 2016. And then Ion made a deal with CTV's parent Bell Media to co-produce season 4 and future seasons of the series and season 4 premiered in 2017. On December 17, 2015, CTV and Ion ordered a fifth and final season of the series, which premiered on CTV on March 12, 2017 and ended on August 3, 2017 and on Ion in early 2018 and ended in the summer of that year.

Series overview

Episodes

Season 1 (2012)

Season 2 (2013–14)

Season 3 (2014–15)
Season 3 episode titles are named after films.

Season 4 (2015–16)
Season 4 episode titles are The Rolling Stones song titles.

Season 5 (2017)

References

External links
 

Lists of Canadian drama television series episodes